Pure Disco is the name of a series of compilation CDs of disco, dance and funk music released by the Universal Music Group under the UTV Records label.

Albums

Pure Disco
 Village People - "Y.M.C.A." (3:44)
 Kool & The Gang - "Celebration" (3:39)
 ABBA – "Dancing Queen" (3:46)
 Donna Summer - "Hot Stuff" (3:48)
 Gloria Gaynor – "I Will Survive" (3:16)
 Barry White – "You're the First, the Last, My Everything" (3:23)
 Teena Marie – "I Need Your Lovin'" (3:34)
 Amii Stewart - "Knock on Wood" (3:42)
 Alicia Bridges – "I Love the Nightlife" (3:06)
 Imagination – "Flashback" (3:41)
 KC & the Sunshine Band – "That's the Way (I Like It)" (3:02)
 The Ritchie Family – "Best Disco in Town" (3:12)
 Yvonne Elliman – "If I Can't Have You" (2:54)
 The Gap Band – "Oops Upside Your Head (I Don't Believe You Want to Get Up and Dance)" (3:24)
 Diana Ross – "Love Hangover" (3:45)
 The Gibson Brothers – "Cuba" (3:40)
 Lipps, Inc. – "Funkytown" (3:55)
 Marvin Gaye – "Got to Give It Up, Pt. 1" (4:07)
 Thelma Houston – "Don't Leave Me This Way" (3:35)
 Donna Summer – "I Feel Love" (Rollo & Sister Bliss Monster Mix) (3:54)
 Olivia Newton-John and John Travolta – "Grease Megamix: You're the One That I Want/Greased Lighting/Summer Nights" (4:50)

Pure Disco 2
 Gloria Gaynor – "I Will Survive" Remix (4:00)
 KC & the Sunshine Band – "(Shake, Shake, Shake) Shake Your Booty"  (3:08)
 Vicki Sue Robinson – "Turn the Beat Around"  (3:26)
 The Village People – "Macho Man"  (3:27)
 Sister Sledge – "We Are Family"  (3:36)
 Irene Cara – "Flashdance...What a Feeling"  (3:57)
 Andy Gibb – "I Just Want to Be Your Everything"  (3:46)
 Carl Carlton – "Everlasting Love"  (2:37)
 Barry White – "Can't Get Enough of Your Love, Babe"  (3:55)
 Hues Corporation – "Rock the Boat"  (3:09)
 The Ohio Players – "Love Rollercoaster"  (2:54)
 Diana Ross – "Upside Down"  (4:07)
 Wild Cherry – "Play That Funky Music" (3:17)
 Van McCoy – "The Hustle"  (3:29)
 Love Unlimited Orchestra – "Love's Theme"  (4:10)
 ABBA – "Gimme! Gimme! Gimme! (A Man After Midnight)"  (4:50)
 Silver Convention – "Fly, Robin, Fly"  (5:02)
 Anita Ward – "Ring My Bell"  (3:33)
 The Weather Girls – "It's Raining Men"  (3:33)
 Donna Summer – "Last Dance"  (3:19)
 Diva Megamix: "Reach Out I'll Be There/Hot Stuff/I Feel Love/Love and Kisses/I Found Love (Now That)"  (3:05)

Pure Disco 3
 Sister Sledge – “He's the Greatest Dancer” (3:38)
 Chic – “Le Freak” (4:17)
 The Village People – “In the Navy” (3:42)
 The Trammps – “Disco Inferno” (3:33)
 Peaches & Herb – “Shake Your Groove Thing” (3:24)
 Kool & the Gang – “Ladies’ Night” (3:28)
 Gloria Gaynor – “Never Can Say Goodbye” (2:56)
 A Taste of Honey – “Boogie Oogie Oogie” (3:37)
 Donna Summer – “Could It Be Magic” (3:54)
 The Miracles – “Love Machine” (2:54)
 Silver Convention – “Get Up & Boogie” (3:58)
 The Three Degrees – “When Will I See You Again” (2:58)
 France Joli – “Come to Me” (4:12)
 Patrice Rushen – “Forget Me Nots” (4:06)
 ABBA – Lay All Your Love on Me” (4:32)
 Sylvester – “You Make Me Feel (Mighty Real)” (3:34)
 The Spinners – “Then Came You” (3:55)
 Andy Gibb – “Shadow Dancing” (4:32)
 Blondie – “Heart of Glass” (3:22)
 Four Seasons – “December, 1963 (Oh, What a Night)” (3:33)
 Olivia Newton-John and John Travolta – "You're the One That I Want" Martian Remix (3:24)

Chart performance and certifications

References

Disco compilation albums
Compilation album series